Luis Miguel Macias Espinoza (born April 1, 1985 in Portoviejo) is an Ecuadorian football forward. He currently plays for LDU Portoviejo.

Club career
Macias began his professional football career with LDU Portoviejo. For the 2010 season, he will be playing for the Ecuadorian giants Barcelona SC.

Macias scored his first goal with Barcelona on February 21, 2010 in a match against Independiente José Terán.

References

External links
Barcelona Official Web site
FEF Player Card

1985 births
Living people
People from Portoviejo
Association football midfielders
Ecuadorian footballers
L.D.U. Portoviejo footballers
Barcelona S.C. footballers
Guayaquil City F.C. footballers
S.D. Aucas footballers
C.D. Quevedo footballers